Clydonopteron is a genus of snout moths. It was described by Norman Denbigh Riley in 1880.

Species
Clydonopteron pomponius H. Druce, 1895
Clydonopteron sacculana (Bosc, 1800)

References

Chrysauginae
Pyralidae genera